Jetfighter III is a 1996 video game developed by Mission Studios and published by Interplay for DOS. It is the third game in the Jetfighter series. An expansion pack, Enhanced Campaign CD, was released in April 1997. It added 74 new missions and two new regions.

Development

Gameplay
Jetfighter III is a game in which the player is the pilot of the F-22N - a fictional variant of the F-22 fighter - assigned to a U.N. battle group.

Reception
Next Generation reviewed the PC version of the game, rating it four stars out of five, and stated that "Jetfighter III manages to soar high when others flop. If you're in the market for a thrilling (but not necessarily realistic) representation of modern air combat, Jetfighter III is a perfect choice. Only a lack of multiplayer support and mild problems with the game's realism keep this from five-star territory."

Reviews
Computer Gaming World #152 (Mar 1997)
PC Games (Germany) - Jan, 1997
PC Player (Germany) - Jan, 1997

References

1996 video games
Combat flight simulators
DOS games
DOS-only games
Video games developed in the United States
Video games with expansion packs